Bling Bling is a straight-to-video release of clips from the Da Ali G Show, plus unaired segments and an interview with David and Victoria Beckham from a Comic Relief special. It is hosted by Ali G himself.

Contents
Introduction
Posh & Bex
Economiks
Evolushun
L.A. Gangz with Alex Alonso

Crime
More Animalz
Ghosts
Borat Jagshemash
Edinbur Festival
Politics
A Real Lord
Bowling
Posh & Bex (part 2)
Da End

DVD Extraz
Extended and unseen interviews
Trailer for Ali G Indahouse

External links 
 
 Ali G & Alex A. Alonso, Watch Author Alex A. Alonso interviewed by Ali G

Television videos and DVDs
British comedy films
2001 comedy films
2001 films
2000s English-language films
2000s British films